Enzo Leopold (born 23 July 2000) is a German professional footballer who plays as a midfielder for Hannover 96.

Career
Leopold made his professional debut for SC Freiburg II in the 3. Liga on 2 October 2021 against Hallescher FC.

On 10 May 2022, Leopold signed a two-year contract with Hannover 96, starting in the 2022–23 season.

References

External links
 
 
 
 

2000 births
Living people
People from Ortenaukreis
Sportspeople from Freiburg (region)
Footballers from Baden-Württemberg
German footballers
Association football midfielders
SC Freiburg II players
Hannover 96 players
2. Bundesliga players
3. Liga players
Regionalliga players